Andrea Armstrong (born May 18, 1982) is an American who is a former NCAA basketball player.

Armstrong hails from Lakeside, Oregon, but was born in Longview, Washington.

After a stellar high school basketball career, Armstrong began her collegiate sports career in 2001, with the Kansas State University basketball team. She played for Kansas State until the 2002 season.  She was a 2002 Academic All-Big 12 selection.

Armstrong transferred to the University of South Florida in 2003, which was a red shirt season in accordance with NCAA regulations.  She was team co-captain for the 2004 season.  She claimed to have converted to Islam soon after her arrival at the Florida campus.

Armstrong created a controversy when she requested to be allowed to play in Islamically appropriate attire. The school initially did not want to allow her to do this, and Armstrong lost her scholarship in the first week of September of that year.

On September 11, the school announced it was going to back off and let Armstrong wear modest athletic attire for their basketball games, and re-instate her scholarship. Armstrong and school officials had met the previous day to discuss her reinstatement. Ahmed Bedler, spokesman for the Council on American-Islamic Relations, was present at the reunion, and he declared that "An athlete should not be asked to choose between engaging in healthy sporting activities and her deeply held religious beliefs".

Days later, Armstrong left the team. She averaged three points and two rebounds per game for South Florida.

In October, Armstrong also left Florida and returned to Oregon, where she e-mailed a local newspaper her reversion to Christianity and renunciation of Islam, and regretfully retracted her conversion to the latter.

Kansas State and South Florida statistics

Source

References

1982 births
Living people
American former Muslims
American women's basketball players
Kansas State Wildcats women's basketball players
South Florida Bulls women's basketball players
Forwards (basketball)
Centers (basketball)
Basketball players from Oregon
Basketball players from Washington (state)
People from Coos County, Oregon
People from Longview, Washington